Kevin Martín Quevedo Mathey (born 22 February 1997) is a Peruvian footballer who plays as a right winger for  Liga 1 club  Deportivo Garcilaso.

Club career

Youth
Quevedo's first experience on a youth academy was at Alianza Lima in 2002. Later on, he was transferred to Academia Héctor Chumpitaz, who brought him up and wherein he managed to get through all the ranks. He had such an outstanding 2014 season that, recommended by Universitario's former footballer Héctor Chumpitaz, he was finally signed by that club to play for their Reserves squad. It is mistakenly believed that he has played for Universitario's youth academy because Quevedo played for the Reserves squad before his professional debut. Truth is, Quevedo was transferred to Universitario in 2015 when he had already aged out.

Universitario
Quevedo made his competitive debut on 13 August 2016 with Universitario in the Peruvian Primera División. The Peruvian icon Roberto Challe was the coach who gave Quevedo his first minutes in the league. Quevedo playing as a substitute in the last 21 minutes ending in a 2–1 loss against Universidad Técnica de Cajamarca.

Alianza Lima
Quevedo made his debut starting with Alianza Lima on 12 March 2017 against Juan Aurich Peruvian side ending in a 7–2, and scored 4 goals.
 
Alianza Lima would eventually go on to win the title that season.
He made his Copa Sudamericana debut on 31 May 2017 match against Club Atlético Independiente.

In the 2018 season, he played 38 games and scored 4 goals. He helped Alianza Lima finish the season in 2nd place.

Goiás 
On February 20, 2020, Quevedo as a free-agent signed a two-year contract with Brazilian club Góias.

Melgar 
On February 8, 2021, Quevedo returned to his home country to join FBC Melgar.

International career

Youth
He was first called up for Peru national under-20 football team during its attempt to qualify for the 2017 FIFA U-20 World Cup. Peru performed poorly in the 2017 South American U-20 Championship, with the team finished bottom with two draws and two losses. Subsequently, he was called up for the Peru national under-23 football team to represent Peru in the 2019 Pan American Games, which Peru made its football debut as hosts. The country's youth team performed poorly as well, with Peru finishing bottom in their group, but Quevedo earned praise for his performance, scoring one goal in process, and was highly recommended by manager of the U-23 team, Nolberto Solano.

However, his career was dented due to the La Videna Disco scandal when he did not appear to train with Peru Olympic football team for the 2020 CONMEBOL Pre-Olympic Tournament. Subsequently, it was discovered that he was instigated by three other members of the senior squad, Andy Polo, Jefferson Farfán and Raúl Ruidíaz. As for the result, Kevin Quevedo was suspended from the Olympic team by the FPF while the Peru Olympic team would go on finishing bottom and failed to qualify for the 2020 Summer Olympics.

Senior
He made his debut in the encounter against Ecuador in a friendly game on 6 September 2019, where Peru was beaten 0–1 by Ecuador.

References

External links
Kevin Quevedo at Soccerway US
Kevin Quevedo at Football Database
Kevin Quevedo at Eurosport 
Kevin Quevedo at Trome Peru Bio 

Club Universitario de Deportes footballers
Club Alianza Lima footballers
FBC Melgar footballers
Peruvian footballers
Peru international footballers
Goiás Esporte Clube players
Campeonato Brasileiro Série A players
Living people
1997 births
Footballers from Lima
Association football midfielders
Deportivo Garcilaso players